Micky Rabinovitz is an Israeli film producer and company owner of "Light Stream Israel".

Biography
Micky Rabinovitz has been working in the Israeli film industry for 3 decades.
He worked as a producer and company owner in "Metro Communications" for a few years.
In 2006  Rabinovitz founded "Light Stream Israel",  his own film production company with Mr. Jim Abrams from the USA.

Filmography

Feature films
2018 - Aad Hakatze (Gesta 2) - Producer - Director: Kobi Mahat - shooting August 2017
2017 - Gesta - Producer - Director: Kobi Mahat - shooting August 2016
2015 – Silent Victory – Pre Pro - Producer
2015 - Last Verse – Director: Udi Aloni – producer – Davis Silber – Line producer
2014 - Baba Jon - Director: Yuval Dalshad – Line producer – shooting May 2014
2014 – Sand Birds – Director: Amir Wolf – shooting Feb 2014 - Line producer
2013 – Apples from the Desert – directors: Matti Harari and Arik Lubetzki – Line producer
2013 – Hill start – Director: Oren Stern – Line producer
2011 – Kidon – Director: Emmanuel Naccache - Producers: Moshe Edery & Michael Sharfstien  – Line Producer
2010 – Playoff – Director: Eran Riklis - shooting in Germany – producers: Michael Sharftien & Moshe Edery - Line Producer
2008 - A House Divided (Mount of Olives) – Director: Mitch Davis -  Production Services to an American Film
2008 - Hello Goodbye – A France movie with Gérard Depardieu  - Production services
2007 - Storm Of Emotion – Producer. Feature documentary, 84 min. director: Yael Klopmann – The movie won many prizes around the world and was short listed to the Academy of motion pictures 2007
2006 - Aviva My Love – Director: Shemi Zarhin - Co-Producer.
2006 - Bubble – Director: Eytan Fox - Co-Producer
2005 - Joy – Director: Julie Shles - Co-Producers
2004 - Metallic Blues – Director: Dan Verete - Co-Producer 
2004 - Turn Left at the End of the World - Director: Avi Nesher – Co-Producer  
2004 - Columbian Love - Director: Shay Kanot - Co-Producer
2004 - Walk on Water – Director: Eytan Fox - Co-Producer  
2003 - Sima Vaknin, Witch – Director: Dror Shaul – Producer
2002 - The B.B.Q People – Co-Producer
1996 - Minotaur – Director: Jonathan Tammuz - Producer 
1994 - Scar – Director: Haim Bouzaglo – Producer

Television Series and Dramas

 1999 - Zinzana – Director Haim Bouzaglo - The 39 episodes series features highlights of prison stories in Israel 
 1997 - Yarkon Files - Director Haim Bouzaglo - Recipient of the 1997 Israeli Academy awards for Television series 
 1998 - Pisces - Television 90 Min. Drama 
 1998 - The Southern Beach - A mini-series of five 50 min. episodes
 1996 - First Loves - A three 50 min. episode mini-series for television 
 1996 - The Field of Hope - A Television Drama 
 1996 - The Marzipan Woman – Director Eitan Green  - A 50 minutes television drama

Documentaries

2012 - Through the Eyes of Yoni Hamenahem – Director: Yael Klopmann – 40 years of Israeli cinema
1998 - Cosmic Optimism - 6 episodes (30 min. each) - India 
1998 - The Crossing to Firellia - A 50 min. 
1998 - Bonjour Madame, Raymonde el'Beduwia - A 50 minutes documentary - Moroccan
1997 - What's So Funny? - A mini series of 4 episodes, 25 min. each.

Other projects

Many commercials, four of which were produced for American Television, Two commercials for “McDonald's” China, “Remington” for the US TV.
17 min. infomercial – Olive Oil – US market
Many Video clips of Israeli artists, among them: The Black Tulip, Nikmat HaTraktor, Sharon Haziz, Is Hop...
Fiddler on the Roof - A musical special for TROS, the Netherlands, the Dutch television, for the national celebration Jerusalem 3,000. Director: Ralph Inbar. 
1992 - Bible Travel - A 13-part ZDF (German TV) drama - Line producer
1992 - Ben Gurion - Part of a French series, Director: Jerry Schatzberg - Line producer
1991 - Bit of luck – feature film – Directed by Ze'ev Revach - Line producer
1991 - Tel Aviv's stories - Directors Ayelet Menahemi and Nirit Yaron - feature film - Production Manager
1990 - Stolen Father 3 – feature film – Director Ayelet Menahemi - Production Manager
1990 - 3 weeks in Jerusalem with Faye Dunaway – feature film – Director Amos Kollek - Production Manager
1989 - Breaking - feature film - Director: Yosi Zomer - Line producer		
1988 - The owl - feature film - Director: Amnon Rubinstein - Line Producer
1987 - Lemon Popsicle 7  - feature film - 	Director: Walter Bannert - Location Manager
1986 - Gloves – feature film - Director: Rafi Hadar - Line producer
1985 - Shovrim - feature film -	Director: Avi Nesher - Location Manager
 1984 - Rage & Glory - feature film - Director: Avi Nesher- Location Manager
 1985 - Girls - feature film - Director: Nadav Levitan - Location Manager
 1984 - The Ambassador - feature film - Director: J. Lee Thompson - Art department asst. 
1982 - Around the world - feature film - Director: Alan Yakobovitz - Location Manager.
1980-93	Producer / Line producer: Commercials and documentaries in Israel and abroad.

References

External links
Official site

Micky Rabinovitz at Ishim site (Hebrew)
Micki Rabinovitz At Edb site (Hebrew)

Israeli film producers
Year of birth missing (living people)
Place of birth missing (living people)
Living people